Mokole (or Mokollé, Mokwale, Monkole, Féri) is a Yoruboid language spoken in the villages surrounding the town of Kandi in Benin. Its speakers constitute a sub-group of Yoruba originated people that are often attached to the Bariba people of Benin.

References

Yoruboid languages
Languages of Benin